Capiznon or Capiceño is an Austronesian regional language spoken in Western Visayas in the Philippines. Capiznon is concentrated in the province of Capiz in the northeast of Panay Island. It is a member of the Bisayan language family and the people are part of the wider Visayan ethnolinguistic group, who constitute the largest Filipino ethnolinguistic group. The language is often confused with Hiligaynon due to dialectological comprehension similarities and as high as 91% mutual intelligibility, but it has its certain unique accent and vocabulary that integrates Aklanon and Waray lexicon. Despite its distinct corruption of Hiligaynon lateral approximants, a prevalent feature among rural farmers, ethnic convergence and cosmopolitanism has led to a shift back to the purely Hiligaynon prosodic form of slower tonality and softer and longer vowels most particularly among the younger generations.

Distribution
Capiznon is spoken in the following municipalities:

Capiz
Roxas City
Ivisan
Panay
Panitan
Maayon
Dao
Pilar
Mambusao
Pontevedra
President Roxas
Sapi-an
Sigma
Cuartero
Dumarao
Dumalag
Jamindan
Tapaz

Iloilo
Batad
Calinog
Bingawan
Lemery
Passi City
Lambunao
Carles
Estancia
Sara
San Rafael
Concepcion
San Dionisio
Balasan
San Enrique
Ajuy

Aklan
Altavas
Batan
Balete
Libacao

Masbate
Balud
Mandaon

Romblon
Cajidiocan
Magdiwang
San Fernando

Common lexical differences between Capiznon and Hiligaynon languages

See also
Hiligaynon language
Capiz
Capiznon people

External links

References

Visayan languages
Languages of Capiz
Languages of Iloilo
Languages of Aklan
Languages of Masbate